Gonzo Papers, Vol. 2: Generation of Swine: Tales of Shame and Degradation in the '80s is a book by the American writer and journalist Hunter S. Thompson, originally published in 1988. The book contains 100 of Thompson's columns that appeared from September 1985 to November 1988 in the San Francisco Examiner, which discuss the politics and culture of the 1980s, with significant coverage of the Iran-Contra Affair, and Gary Hart's run for president.

He predicts that the Democrats will self-destruct in the 1988 presidential campaign. He also makes bets about the Democratic Party candidates odds of winning their elections. People he dislikes are described as "money-sucking animals," "brainless freaks," "geeks," "greed-crazed lunatics" and so on. Thompson also quotes from the Bible's Book of Revelation in many instances. 

It is the second volume of the four-volume The Gonzo Papers series. Besides the first six columns (which front-load the collection by setting up the overtly political aspect of the book's main topics), the columns are presented in chronological order.

One oft-quoted, and misquoted, passage from Volume 2 is about the television broadcasting business, specifically television journalism:

References

Essay collections by Hunter S. Thompson
1988 books
Summit Books books